The Wheatland Music Festival is a music and arts festival organized by the Wheatland Music Organization, a non-profit organization specializing in the preservation and presentation of traditional arts and music. Community outreach services include programming for Senior facilities and schools across mid-Michigan, year-round instrument lessons, scholarship programs, Jamborees, Traditional Dances, and Wheatscouts - a free program educating children through music, dance, storytelling, crafts and nature.  Each year, the organization holds its annual Traditional Arts Weekend the weekend of Memorial Day, and its annual festival during the second weekend in September in the unincorporated community of Remus in the state of Michigan, in the United States. The first Wheatland Music Festival was held August 24, 1974.

History
In the early 1970s a small group of Mt. Pleasant Food Co-Op (now the GreenTree Cooperative Grocery) members and local musicians were staging free concerts and benefits around the Big Rapids and Mt. Pleasant, MI areas. Common sites were city parks and public halls. Proceeds enabled the food co-op to pay rent and utilities.  Meanwhile, founders of the Wheatland Music Organization were organizing about two concerts a month during the summer.

The First Wheatland Bluegrass Festival was held as a benefit for the Mt. Pleasant Food Co-Op, August 24, 1974.  It was a one-day event held on the Rhode family farm, located four miles east of Remus on M-20.  June Rhodes' utility room became festival headquarters, her backyard was the backstage area, and her sister-in-law's yard across the road was the parking lot. The flatbed trailers were in place along with the first-aid tent, a sound system, and a hotdog stand.

By 1975 Wheatland was born. Elections were held and the board of directors was established. Many of the first directors are still active in the organization. This can be attributed to their faith in each other, their commitment to community service, and passion for preserving and presenting traditional music and arts.

With the 47th annual festival being deferred to 2021, officials blamed the COVID-19 pandemic as the result of 2020's cancellation.

2021 festival and lineup were announced in June 2021, however due to rising rates of COVID-19 the 2021 festival was cancelled on August 11, with the next festival deferred to September 2022.

Timeline

1970s

1974

1st Wheatland Music Festival (one-day event on Aug 24)

1975

Board of Directors Established (May 13)
Articles of Incorporation filed as "Wheatland Music Organization" (May 29)
Festival moved to Wernette Farm

1976

Wheatland Music Festival becomes a 2-day event
Information tent was born: rented from the Beal City Knights of Columbus

1977

Wheatland Bylaws are ratified/amended
Non-Profit Status is awarded
1st Wheatlan Music Festival album is produced
1st WMO Reunion is held at Central Michigan University

1978

1st "Main Stage" is built

1979

"Our Front Porch" radio show is developed
Costabella Cloggers make 1st appearance at Wheatland Music Festival
Public Transportation 1st used at Wheatland Music Festival

1980s

1980

Day-long textile arts workshops held at Wheatland in March
6 Albums are now on Wheatland's Record Label
1st Grant was received to host a Community Education Program in October

1981

1st WMO Newsletter is established

1982

WMO purchases their 1st computer
WCMU Begins taping the music festival

1983 Land purchase: WMO puts $100 down on Gunnison Property

WMO Sponsors 1st Music Conference
WMO Begins Old Time Country dances in Mt. Pleasant

1984

"Our Front Porch" radio show is offered to National Public Radio
Land Contract signed to purchase 20 acres from Mark and Gladys Wernette

1985

Wheatland Cabin is built
Kids Hill Playhouse is built

1986

More work done at Kids Hill: 5 picnic tables built along with a wood-framed swing and fenced-in area for sheep

1987

A recycling program is introduced at Wheatland
Ice made available for sale on site for first time
Wheatscouts program for children begins at Wheatland
WMO monthly Jamboreed begin at Wheatland

1988

"Third Stage" Dance Pavilion is built
WMO added "Inc." to its name
WMO Logo Trademarked/Patented
Teen Dance at the Festival is established

1989

Elyce Fishman Scholarship established
1st Wheatland Dance Camp is held over Memorial Day Weekend (May 26–28)
WMO collaborates with MSU to produce "Michigan In Song" Michigan performers cassettes
WMO Presented with "Ambassador's Award" by Mecosta County Chamber of Commerce

1990s

1990

140 Acres purchased from Mark and Gladys Wernette
WMO Board develops revised mission statement, bylaws and organizational goals
WMO Copyright registration process begins
The Gladys Wernette Classroom Building is built

1991

Kitchen Building is built
Wheatland Memberships begin
Mark and Gladys Wernette celebrate their 55th wedding anniversary

1992

Information Building is built
Electricity became available at all work stations and lighting is added to the campgrounds
Orientation Workshops begin for campground volunteers
"Peace Train" added to Kids Hill

1998

Original "Main Stage" is moved to Kids Hill
The structure now known as "Main Stage" is built

2000s

2001

The Hospitality Building known as the "Post Office" is built in honor of Mark Wernette

"2014" whoo-hoo!! 
40th. Anniversary Wheatland music festival.  "Carry it on" dance project. To hopefully another 40 years.

Performers by year

2010s
2019

Robbie Fulks and Linda Gail Lewis
 Red Squirrel Chasers
 Freddy & Francine
Hazmat Modine
The Mammals
 The Jones Family Singers
 Short Round String Band
The Quebe Sisters
 Alsadair Frasier and the New World Assembly
Tim O'Brien Band
 De Temps Antan
The Special Consensus
 Dead Horses
 K. Jones and The Benzie Playboys
 Escaping Pavement
 Roosevelt Diggs
 The Journeymen
May and The Motivations
 Sally Rogers and Claudia Schmidt
Dick Siegel
 Forest Huval

2018
 John McCutcheon
 Darrell Scott
 Thornetta Davis
 Kittel & Co.
 Town Mountain
 Charley Crockett
 Las Cafeteras
 Front Country
 Altan
 Steppin' In It
 Corn Potato String Band
 Nora Jane Struthers
 SHIFT
 Joe Hall & The Cane Cutters
 The Schrock Brothers
 Jen Sygit
 Elephant Rescue
 Diamonds In The Rust
 Rollie Tussing
 Nickolas James & The Bandwagon
 Emily Rose
 Andy Baker
 John D. Lamb
 Josh Rose
 Sam Corbin
 Jan Krist & Jim Bizer
 Annie & Rod Capps
 Anne Heaton & Frank Marotta

2017

 Michael Cleveland & Flamekeeper
 Radney Foster
 Luke Winslow-King
 Gaby Moreno
 Molsky's Mountain Drifters
 Ruthie Foster
 Jayme Stone's Folklife and Lomax Project
 La Cave Tap Reunion
 The Defibulators
 Feufollet
 Don Julin's Mr. Natural Project
 The Northern Kentucky Brotherhood Singers
 Drew Nelson and Highway 2
 The Bootstrap Boys
 T-Mart Rounders/Milnes, Chesser, & Hill
 Diff and Dudley
 The Avi Lesser Jug Band
 Planet D Nonet

2016

 Asleep at the Wheel
 Charlie Musselwhite
 The Gibson Brothers
 Solas
 Bruce Daigrepont
 Haas Kowert Tice
 Mike + Ruthy
 Footworks
 Nic Gareiss & Friends
 Three Women and the Truth (Mary Gauthier, Gretchen Peters, Eliza Gikyson)
 Adonis Puentes & The Voice of Cuba Orchestra
 The Cactus Blossoms
 Black Twig Pickers
 Luke Winslow-King
 Red Tail Ring
 Stella!
 The Go-Rounds
 Delilah DeWylde & The Lost Boys
 Mark Lavengood Bluegrass Bonanza!
 Soltre
 Ralston Bowles
 Chris Buhalis
 Ira Bernstein
 Frank Allison
 May Erlewine
 Natalie Mae
 Joe Shields
 Michelle Chenard & Pete Kehoe
 Jan Krist & Kim Bizer

2015

 Joshua Davis
 Dervish
 Rock My Soul- The McCrary Sisters & The Fairfield Four
 Foghorn Stringband
 Balsam Range
 Savoy Family 
 Bill Kirchen
 California Feetwarmers
 Jerron "Blind Boy" Paxton
 Peter Mulvey
 Wild Ponies
 Samantha Martin and Delta Sugar
 Rapetipetam
 Gerald Ross
 Lindsay Lou & The Flatbellys
 Rollie Tussing & The Midwest Territory Band
 Gifts or Creatures
 The Mudpuppys

2014

 Rodney Crowell
 Pokey LaFarge
 Sarah Jarosz
 Sharon Shannon
 The Steel Wheels
 Eden Brent
 Bonsoir Catin
 Ira Bernstein
 The Asham Stompers
 Billy Strings & Don Julin
 Big Foot String Band
 Detour
 Nic Gareiss & Maeve Gilchrist
 Claudia Schmidt & Dean McGraw
 Rachael Davis
 Red Tail Ring
 Alafrique
 The Madcat Midnight Blues Journey
 The Accidentals
 Bennett
 Kavazabava
 Michigan Songwriters- Justin VanHaven, "E" Minor, Michael Crittenden, Tracy Kash

2013

 Bela Fleck & Abigail Washburn
 La Bottine Souriante 
 The Reverend Peyton's Big Damn Band
 The Duhks
 Big Sandy and His Fly-Rite Boys
 Billy Strings & Don Julin
 Carry it on... Dance Project
 The Revelers
 The Boxcars
 Run Boy Run
 The Waymores
 Henrie Brothers
 Northern Kentucky Brotherhood Singers 
 The Appleseed Collective
 Bennett 
 Steppin’ In It
 The Palooka Brothers 
 Michigan Songwriters: Rachael Davis, Kitty Donohoe, Michelle Chenard

2012
 Eric Bibb Stringband
 Hoots & Hellmouth
 Cedric Watson & Bijou
 De Temps Antan
 Ruthie Foster 
 Hogwire Stringband
 Gibson Brothers
 Deke Dickerson
Paul Thorn
 Good Foot Dance Ensemble
 Drew Nelson and Highway 2
 The Crane Wives
 Lindsay Lou & the Flatbellys
 Black Jake and The Carnies
 Planet D Nonet

2011
 The Freight Hoppers 
 Abigail Washburn & the Village 
 Craver, Hicks, Watson & Newberry
 Los Texmaniacs
 Peter Rowan Bluegrass Band 
 Rhythmic Circus
 The Starlight Six 
 Ray Bonneville
 Wayne “The Train” Hancock & Willie “Big Eyes” Smith
 An Dro
 Black Jake and The Carnies 
 Blue Water Ramblers
 Jessie Nieves & Nic Gareiss: Life After Limerick 
 Shades of Grey
 The Laws 
 Old Foresters
 Red Sea Pedestrians
 Michigan Songwriters: J. Oscar Bittinger, Karisa Wilson, Kirby & Susan Harrison

2010
 Dave Alvin & the Guilty Women
 Joel Mabus Trio 
 Big Medicine
 BeauSoleil
 Rory Block 
 Laura Cortese 
 Delilah DeWylde and the Lost Boys 
 The Hotmud Family
 Genticorum
 Nic Gareiss & Friends
 The Paschall Brothers
 Slide Ireland
 Jeff & Vida
 The Cornfed Girls
Ralston Bowles
 Open Range 
 Davis vs. Davis
 The Red Sea Pedestrians
 Seth and May
 The Wild Turkeys
 Starlight 6 
 Steppin’ In It
 Michigan Songwriters:  Jill Jack, Barbara Jordan, John Latini, Josh Rose

2000s

2009
 Crooked Still
 The SteelDrivers
 Aubrey Ghent Band
 Red Stick Ramblers
 Ruthie Foster
 Rhythm in Shoes
 Delilah DeWylde and the Lost Boys
 The Radiators
 The Deadly Gentlemen
 De Temps Antan
 The Wilders
 Ginny Hawker and Tracy Schwarz
 Sam Amidon
 Robin and Linda Williams and Their Fine Group
Bruce Molsky and Big Hoedown
 Detour
 Drew Nelson
 Michigan Songwriters: Dave Boutette, Robin Lee Berry, Michael Camp, Dan Hazlett

2008
 Crooked Still
 David "Honeyboy" Edwards
 The Pine Leaf Boys
 The Freight Hoppers
 The Tarbox Ramblers
The Ragbirds
 Dale Watson
 Cheryl Wheeler
 The Cherryholmes Family
 The Chicken Chokers
 Tim Graves & Cherokee
 The Refugees
 Sole Impact
 Slide 
 Bichini Biz Congo Dance Theater Co.
 Michael Smith
 The Jeremy Kittell Band
 Lost World String Band
 Nic Gareiss & Friends
 Madcat, Kane, Schrock & Shimmin 
 Curly Miller and Carole Anne Rose and the Old 78's 
 The Rhythm Billies
 Michigan Songwriters: Jen Cass, Jen Sygit, John Lamb, Michael Camp

2007
 Eric Bibb
 Uncle Earl
 Aubrey Ghent
 The Duhks
 The Gimbles
 GiveWay
 The Lost Bayou Ramblers
 Orpheus Supertones
 Seth Bernard & Daisy May Erlewine
 Mountain Heart
 Earthworks Music
 The Tarbox Ramblers
 Rusty Blaides
 Rhythm in Shoes
 Tom Russell
 Like Water Drum & Dance
 Detour
 The Great Lakes Ceili Band
 The Milroys
 The Schrock Brothers
 Floyd King and the Bushwhackers
 Michigan Songwriters: Drew Nelson, Rawlston Bowles, Jen Sygit, Jen Cass

2006
 Seth Bernard and Daisy May 
Ira Bernstein and Riley Baugus
 The Biddies 
 Calvin Cooke 
 Detour 
 The Duhks 
 Foghorn Stringband 
 Freshwater 
 Grada 
 Green Grass Cloggers
 Whit Hill and The Postcards 
 Hurry The Jug 
 Jay and Molly and Their Family Band 
 Jive At Five 
Randy Kohrs and The Lites
 Lafayette Rhythm Devils
 Los Bandits 
 Pat Madden 
 Mamadou Diabate Ensemble 
 Michigan Songwriters in the Round
 Mountain Town Moonshiners
 Tim O'Brien 
 Sally Potter
 The Ragbirds
 Rootstand

2005
 Charivari
 Hillbilly Idol
 Robert Jones
 King Wilkie
 Laurie Lewis
 Maria Muldaur and Her Red Hot Bluesiana Band
 Pierce Pettis 
 Red Stick Ramblers 
 Rhythm In Shoes
 The Rockinghams
 Steppin' In It
 Le Vent du Nord
 The Wilders

2004
 Campbell Brothers 
 Footworks
 Whit Hill and The Postcards 
 King Wilkie 
 Louisiana Red 
 The Mammals 
 Mollie O'Brien and Jive At Five 
 Steve Riley and the Mamou Playboys 
 Darrell Scott 
 Solas 
 Dale Watson and His Lone Stars 
 The Wilders 
 Robin and Linda Williams and their Fine Group

2003
 Big Sandy and His Fly-Rite Boys
 Charivari 
 The Dixie Hummingbirds
 Donna the Buffalo
 Door Nails
 Grasshoppah
 Josh Graves and Kenny Baker
 Jive At Five
 The Mammals
 Tim O'Brien
 Ramble Shoe
 Red Clay Ramblers
 Rhythm In Shoes
 Saffire - The Uppity Blues Women 
 Dick Siegel
 Chris Smither
 Rodney Sutton
 Blake Travis
 Vishten

2002
 Aztec 
 Eric Bibb 
 Norman and Nancy Blake 
 Clayfoot Strutters
 Geno Delafose 
 Rachael Davis 
 Johnny Gimble and the Hot Club of Cowtown 
 Buddy and Julie Miller 
 Millish 
 Melvin Mosley and The Spirit of Memphis 
 Mountain Heart 
 Rhythm In Shoes 
 April Verch

2001
 Balfa Toujours 
 Barachois 
 Big Sandy and His Fly-Rite Boys 
 Blue Highway
 Calvin Cooke Sacred Steel Ensemble
 Chief O'Neill's House Band 
 Guy Clark 
 Stacey Earle 
 Footworks 
 John Hammond, Jr.
 Ill-Mo Boys 
 Tom, Brad, and Alice 
 The Whites
 
2000
 Howard Armstrong Trio 
 Lee Benoit and the Bayou Stompers 
 Ira Bernstein and Company 
 Blue Highway
 Blues Swingers
 Guy Davis
 Fat City String Band
 Hillbilly Idol
 Lynn Morris Band
 Tim O'Brien and The Crossing 
 Los Pleneros de la 21
Claudia Schmidt
 Tongue and Groove
 Volo Bogtrotters

1990s

1999
 Los Bandits
 Barton and Sweeney
 Blues Swingers 
 Lee Benoit and the Bayou Stompers
 Cephas and Wiggins
 Guy Clark
 The Dixie Hummingbirds
 Footworks
 Freight Hoppers
 Hillbilly Idol
 Improbabillies
 Patty Larkin
 Claire Lynch

1998
 Ira Bernstein 
 Ralph Blizard and the New Southern Ramblers 
 Continental Divide 
 Critton Hollow String Band 
 De Dannan 
 The Dixie Hummingbirds 
 Iowa Rose 
 Jive At Five 
 Joel Mabus 
 Tim and Mollie O'Brien with Jerry Douglas
 Steve Riley and the Mamou Playboys 
 Rhythm In Shoes 
 Sally Rogers 
 Saffire - The Uppity Blues Women 
 Samite 
 Robin and Linda Williams and their Fine Group
 
1997
 Bone Tones
 Continental Divide 
 Ramblin' Jack Elliott 
 Footworks 
 Freight Hoppers 
 Johnny Gimble 
 Jive At Five 
 Los Bandits 
 Larry Penn 
 Rhythm Rats 
 Paul Rishell and Anne Raines 
 Schryer Triplets 
 Solas 
 Rosalie Sorrels 
 Gillian Welch and David Rawlings

1996
 Mac Benford and His Woodshed Allstars 
 Benoit Bourque and Gaston Bernard 
 Ira Bernstein
 Bing Brothers 
 Burns Sisters 
 Johnny Gimble and Texas Swing 
 Laurie Lewis and Grant Street 
 Raisin Pickers and Crows Feet 
 Red Mules 
 Rhythm In Shoes 
 Peter Rowan and Jerry Douglas 
 Saffire - The Uppity Blues Women 
 Dick Siegel 
 Pop Wagner and Glenn Ohrlin

1995
 Amaryllis
 Critton Hollow String Band 
 Del McCoury Band
 Footworks 
 Jive At Five
 Si Kahn
 Los Bandits
 Kate MacKenzie
 Tim and Mollie O'Brien and the O'Boys
 Open House
 Raisin Pickers
 Renegades
 Steve Riley and the Mamou Playboys
 Saffire - The Uppity Blues Women
 Samite
 Second Opinion

1994
 Kitty Donohoe
 Gospel Warriors 
 Indian Creek Delta Boys
 Jive At Five
 John Hartford
 Kapelye
 Lonesome River Band
 Poodles
 Rhythm In Shoes 
 Steve Riley and the Mamou Playboys
 Jody Stecher and Kate Brislin
 Thundering Cannonballs
 Claude "Fiddler" Williams

1993
 Ira Bernstein
 Bone Tones 
 Critton Hollow String Band 
 Dry Branch Fire Squad 
 Feltliners 
 Fiddle Puppets with Rodney Sutton
 Heartbeats
 Lonesome River Band
 Joel Mabus
 Peter Ostroushko and Dean Magraw
 Utah Phillips
 Red Mule String Band
Peter Madcat Ruth and Shari Kane
 Reunited Gospel Echoes 
 Sally Rogers and Claudia Schmidt
 Trian
 Volo Bogtrotters
 Robin and Linda Williams with Jim Watson and Kevin Maul 
 
1992
 Ira Bernstein
 Bone Tones 
 Bryan Bowers
 Cephas and Wiggins
 Cathy Fink and Marcy Marxer
 Ginny Hawker  and Kay Justice
 Hoosier Humdingers
 Tim and Mollie O'Brien
 Tim O'Brien and the O'Boys
 Old time Missouri Fiddlers and Dancers 
 Pashami Dancers
 Porkypines
 Red Mule String Band

1991
 Howard Armstrong and Ray Kamalay
 Mac Benford and His Woodshed Allstars
 Bone Tones 
 Cobb Brothers
 Drummers and Dancers
 Fiddle Puppets
 Holmes Brothers
 Alison Krauss and Union Station
 Lost World String Band
 Tim and Mollie O'Brien
 Old Time Missouri Fiddlers 
 Robin Petrie and Danny Carnahan
 Ranch Romance
 Saginaw Ojibwe Singers
 Dick Siegel
 
1990
 Birmingham Sunlights 
 Ralph Blizard and The New Southern Ramblers 
 Kevin Burke, James Kelly, and Gerry O'Beirne
 Critton Hollow String Band 
 Drummers and Dancers
 Henrie Brothers
 David Holt
 Santiago Jimenez, Jr. 
 Laurie Lewis and Grant Street 
 North Carolina Blues Revue
 Maura O'Connell
 Rhythm In Shoes
 Saginaw Ojibwe Singers
 Dick Siegel
 Song Sisters
 Volo Bogtrotters

1980s

1989
 Ira Bernstein 
 Ralph Blizard and The New Southern Ramblers 
 Delton Broussard and The Lawtell Playboys 
 Cephas and Wiggins 
 Fiddle Puppets 
 Henrie Brothers 
 Johnny Gimble 
 Howard Levy 
 Laurie Lewis and Grant Street 
 Joel Mabus
 Memphis Beck and the Red Hots 
 Millie Ortego 
 Song Sisters 
 Sukay 
 Wildcats 
 Robin and Linda Williams

1988
 Ralph Blizard and The New Southern Ramblers
 Greg Brown
 Chicken Chokers
 Les Danseurs de la Rivière-Rouge
 Fiddle Puppets
 Johnny Gimble
 David Holt
 Heartbeats
 Iowa Rose
 Laketown Buskers
 Nashville Bluegrass Band
 LaVaughn Robinson
 Terrance Simien and The Mallet Playboys
 Song Sisters 
 The Tannahill Weavers
 Dick Tarrier
 Volo Bogtrotters

1987
 Chicken Chokers 
 Lotus Dickey and Bob Lucas
 Kitty Donohoe 
 Fairfield Four
 Fiddle Puppets
 Folktellers 
 Green Grass Cloggers 
 The Horse Flies
 Denny Jones, Paul Kovac, and Clear Fork 
 Kentucky Warblers
 Red Clay Ramblers 
Peter Madcat Ruth
 Johnny Shines, Peter Ostroushko and the Mando Boys
 Volo Bogtrotters

1986
 Ira Bernstein
 Ken Bloom
 Bob Brozman and Brownie McGhee
 The Dixie Hummingbirds
 Lost World String Band
 Reel World String Band 
 Riders In The Sky
Peter Madcat Ruth
 Savoy-Doucet
 Howard "Sandman" Sims 
 Skylark 
 Rosalie Sorrels 
 Pete Sutherland
 Dick Tarrier 
 Uncles and the Footnotes 
 Robin and Linda Williams

1985
 O.J. Anderson
 Dewey Balfa
 Ira Bernstein
 Costabella Cloggers
 Critton Hollow String Band
 Percy Danforth
 Sheila Dailey
 The Dixie Hummingbirds
 Doug dillard Band
 Eclectricity
 Fiddle Puppets
 Cathy Fink
 Friends of Fiddlers Green
 The Horse Flies
 Hot Rize
 Iowa Ros
 Ray Kamalay
 Joel Mabus
 Malone, Carroll, Keane and O'Connell
 Red Knuckles and the Trailblazers
 Rugcutters
 Dick Tarrier

1984
 O.J. Anderson
 Beausoleil
 Ken Bloom
 Canebrake Rattlers
 Costabella Cloggers
 Double Decker String Band
 Dave and Kay Gordon
 Hot Rize
 Iowa Rose and Riff Raff
 Ira Bernstein
 Si Kahn
 Kinvara
 Red Clay Ramblers
 Red Hot Peppers
 Claudia Schmidt
 Shuffle Creek Dancers
 Sweet Honey in the Rock
 Dick Tarrier
 Trapezoid
 
1983
 Beausoleil
 Sandy Bradley and The Small Wonder String Band
 Major Contay and the Canebrake Rattlers
 Costabella Cloggers
 Jean Denny
 Robert Dodson
 Double Decker String Band
 Fiddle Puppets
 Foot Loose
 Day and Kay Gordon
 Henrie Brothers
 Hot Mud Family
 Lost World String Band
 Joel Mabus
 Na Cabar Feidh
 Reel Union
 Sally Rogers
 Claudia Schmidt
 Mike Seeger 
 Dick Tarrier
 
1982
 Blue Velvet
 Boreal String Band
 Dan Brandon, Rex and Letha Raymond
 Bryan Bowers
 Costabella Cloggers
 De Dannan
 Fiddle Puppets
 Hotfoot Quintet
 Hot Mud Family
 Lost World String Band
 Mulligan Dancers
 New Pairie Ramblers
 Northland College Voyageurs
 Utah Phillips
 Riders In The Sky
 Sally Rogers
 Dick Tarrier
 Will White and Paul Gifford
 Robin and Linda Williams
 
1981
Bosom Buddies
Wilma Lee Cooper and the Clinch Mountain Clan
Dance All Night
De Dannan
Rick and Maureen Del Grosso
Fiction Brothers
Fiddle Puppets
Henrie Brothers
Hot Mud Family
Ken Bloom
Mulligan Dancers
 Na Cabar Feidh
 Percy Danforth
 Red Clay Ramblers
 Sally Rogers
 Dick Tarrier
 John Turner and the Fiddletree Band
 Whetstone Run
 Williams Family
 
1980
Backwoods String Band
Tony Barrand
Costabella Cloggers
Hazel Dickins
Fiction Brothers
Fiddle Puppets
Henrie Brothers
Si Kahn
Lost World String Band
Michael, McCreesh, and Campbell
Quackgrass
Reel World String Band
Jim Ringer and Mary Caslin
Roustabouts
Sweet Corn
John Turner
Whetstone Run
Robin and Linda Williams

1970's

1979
Backwoods String Band
Costabella Cloggers
Patrick Couton
Dekalb
Dutch Cove String Band
Green Grass Cloggers
Gypsy Gypo String Band
Henrie Brothers
Hot Mud Family
Lost World String Band
Joel Mabus
Port City Bluegrass Boys
Quackgrass
Red Clay Ramblers
Reel World String Band
Jean Ritchie
Roustabout String Band
Tracy and Eloise Schwarz
Mike Seeger and Alice Gerrard
Sinclair Bros.
Carl Story
Williams Family with Jay Round

1978
Patrick Couton
Kitty Donohoe
Fall City Ramblers
Flat Pickers Local No. 169
Green Grass Cloggers
Highwoods String Band
Hot Mud Family
Lost World String Band
Joel Mabus
Wade Mainer
Martin, Bogan and Armstrong
New Pine River Valley Boys
Quackgrass
Quality Quinn
Red Clay Ramblers
Sinclair Bros.
Swamp Cats
Jay Ungar and Lynn Hardy
Vice Versa
Williams Family

1977
Bluegrass Extension Service
Bluegrass Reunion
Cabbage Crik
Alice Gerrard
Hot Mud Family
McLain Family Band
Red Clay Ramblers
Jean Ritchie
Mike Seeger
Sounds of the South
Williams Family

1976
Cabbage Crik
Easy Pickins
Highwoods String Band
Pine River Valley Boys
Mike Seeger
Stillhouse String Band
Sweet Corn
Williams Family

1975
GLA Grass
Kathy Ann and the Sounds of the South
Kentucky Grass
Pine River Valley Boys
RFD Boys
Stillhouse String Band
Don Stover and the White Oak Mountain Boys
Sunset Express
Williams Family

1974
Bean Town Valley Ramblers
Easy Pickins
Kentucky Grass
Roy McGinnis and the Sunnysiders
Pine River Valley Boys
Tennessee Valley Boys

References

External links
 Wheatland Music Organization

Music festivals in Michigan
Music festivals established in 1974
1974 establishments in Michigan